Te Atatū (before 2008 spelled Te Atatu, without a macron) is a parliamentary electorate, returning one Member of Parliament to the New Zealand House of Representatives. The current MP for Te Atatū is Phil Twyford of the Labour Party.

Population centres
The 1977 electoral redistribution was the most overtly political since the Representation Commission had been established through an amendment to the Representation Act in 1886, initiated by Muldoon's National Government. As part of the 1976 census, a large number of people failed to fill in an electoral re-registration card, and census staff had not been given the authority to insist on the card being completed. This had little practical effect for people on the general roll, but it transferred Māori to the general roll if the card was not handed in. Together with a northward shift of New Zealand's population, this resulted in five new electorates having to be created in the upper part of the North Island. The electoral redistribution was very disruptive, and 22 electorates were abolished, while 27 electorates were newly created (including Te Atatu) or re-established.

Te Atatū comprises the suburbs of West Auckland on the western side of the Whau River in Auckland. The main parts of the seat are the suburbs of Glendene, Te Atatū Peninsula, Te Atatū South, Lincoln and Massey. Boundary changes in the leadup to the 2008 election have seen the northern boundary edge northwards to include Massey East, with a small southern block transferred to the neighbouring Waitakere seat.

The makeup of Te Atatū shows that while its population is composed roughly inline with the national average: It is roughly the same ages as the nation (with slightly more residents over fifty), and its average income ($22627) is only slightly lower than the rest of New Zealand. Its main point of demographic difference with its country is ethnic – it has more Asian New Zealanders and more Pacific Islanders than the rest of the country.

History
The Te Atatu electorate was created ahead of the 1978 election by pulling apart the seat of Waitemata; its first MP was future cabinet minister Michael Bassett, who had been the MP for Waitemata from 1972 until 1975 before an anti-labour landslide cost him his job. Bassett held the seat until his retirement in 1990, when a toxic battle to succeed Bassett in an already lean year for Labour passed one of their safe seats into the hands of Brian Neeson. Neeson opted not to recontest Te Atatu in 1993; instead shifting to Waitakere. His departure, coupled with a reversal of electoral fortune for the National Party (down from 47.8 to 35.1 percent) led to a victory for incoming Labour MP Chris Carter. In his first three years in Parliament, Carter made news for being the first openly gay member of Parliament.

With the introduction of MMP voting in 1996, Te Atatū was briefly abolished in favour of a new seat called Waipareira, which covered the same area as Te Atatū but also included the wealthy harbourside suburbs to the north of the seat. Te Atatu was re-established for the 1999 election, with the new seat focused more on the working class suburbs at the southern end of Waitakere City. Carter, who had lost Waipareira to Neeson and spent three years out of Parliament, returned as Te Atatu MP and held the position in the 2002, 2005 and 2008 elections. Since 2008 the electorate has been spelled Te Atatū, with a macron.

Carter resigned from the Labour Party in 2010 and from Parliament in 2011. He was succeeded by Labour's Phil Twyford.

Members of Parliament
Key

List MPs
Members of Parliament elected from party lists in elections since 1999 where that person also unsuccessfully contested the Te Atatū electorate. Unless otherwise stated, all MPs' terms began and ended at general elections.

Election results

2020 election

2017 election

2014 election

2011 election

Electorate (as at 26 November 2011): 43,746

2008 election

2005 election

2002 election

1999 election
Refer to Candidates in the New Zealand general election 1999 by electorate#Te Atatu for a list of candidates.

1993 election

1990 election

1987 election

1984 election

1981 election

1978 election

Notes

References

Bibliography

External links
Electorate Profile  Parliamentary Library

New Zealand electorates in the Auckland Region
Politics of the Auckland Region
1978 establishments in New Zealand
1996 disestablishments in New Zealand
1999 establishments in New Zealand
West Auckland, New Zealand